Centro Universitário das Faculdades Metropolitanas Unidas is a Brazilian institution of higher education located in the city of São Paulo. The university is better known by the acronym FMU, which is maintained for the sake of tradition, since it has been popularly called FMU since its founding.

History 
The Faculdades Metropolitanas Unidas (FMU) was founded in 1968 by Professor Edevaldo Alves da Silva and Professor Onesimus Silveira, then state's attorney of the State of São Paulo.

FMU began operations on July 11, 1968. The same month, hundreds of students attended the first entrance exam. Initially six majors were offered: Law, Economics, Business, Accounting, Education and Social Work.

In 1975, FMU added the Faculdade de Filosofia, Ciências e Letras Santa Rita de Cássia (College of Arts and Sciences), and began offering Psychology, Pedagogy and Languages. In 1976, with the addition of the Faculdade de Educação e Ciências Nova Piratininga (College of Science and Education), Mathematics was added to the enrollment offerings.

In 1987, the institution established its graduate school, which is now known as Centro de Pesquisa e Pós-Graduação (CPPG) (Center for Research and Graduate Studies), which offers 96 master's degree courses, five MBA programs and twenty professional development courses. There is even a unique masters level course on Information Technology Law.

In 1989, FMU created one of its most traditional programs, Physical Education, which is considered one of the best majors in Brazil.

Also in the 1980s, FMU merged with two partner institutions. Faculdades Integradas Alcântara Machado (FIAM) offered a major in Social Communication (and currently offers majors in Journalism, Advertising, Radio and TV). Faculdades de Artes Alcântara Machado (FAAM) includes Faculdade de Música (College of Music), and is the only college in this region of Brazil to earn the highest score on both sections of Exame Nacional de Desempenho de Estudantes (Enade) (a college level standardized test) and its courses in Architecture, City Planning and Administration.

The FMU also partnered with Faculdades Integradas São Paulo (FISP), which currently offers courses in the field of Engineering.

Due to its expansion and following the Brazilian law, FMU changed its name to Centro Universitário (University Center) on March 23, 1999. Soon after, in 2000, it established the Instituto Metropolitano de Altos Estudos (IMAE) (Metropolitan Institution of Higher Education), which develops cross-disciplinary and interdisciplinary studies, focusing on contemporary issues in Brazil. The Institute publishes a Journal: Revista de Cultura IMAE (IMAE Journal of Culture).

As a University Center, the institution now offers many undergraduate majors and vocational degrees.

In one of its campuses, the University has a veterinary hospital, a veterinary medicine farm-school and various health care clinics.

In August 2013, the institution joined the international network of universities Laureate International Universities.

In December 2012, the Ministério da Educação (MEC) (Brazilian Ministry of Education) suspended entrance exams and new enrollment in FMU's Technology and Systems Analysis and Development program because of its poor performance in 2008 and in 2011 in the Conceito Preliminar de Curso (CPC). In 2013, after further review, the Ministry of Education suspended enrollment in several other programs for 2014.

Faculdade de Direito (Law School) 

FMU's Law School was founded in 1968. The law degree it provides is one of the most prestigious in the country. The Ministry of Education gave the program its highest rating. Many of the top lawyers in Brazil are FMU alumni, including Luiz Flávio Borges D’Urso, former president of the Order of Attorneys of Brazil.

Juizado Especial Cível (Small Claims Court)- FMU 

In 1999 the Juizado Especial Cível (Small Claims Court) was created on FMU's Liberdade Campus, as a partnership between the São Paulo Court and FMU. This is the first such court created as part of a Law School in São Paulo. FMU maintains the operational structure required to conduct daily hearings and service to the community.

Undergraduate Academic Offerings 

Campus Centro – College of Music
Campus Itaim Bibi – Colleges of Economics, Accountancy, Business and Law
Campus Liberdade – Colleges of Visual Arts, Law, International Relations and Engineering
Campus Morumbi – Colleges of Social Communication, Journalism, Publicity, Radio and Television
Campus Ponte Estaiada HOVET – Hospital Veterinário – College of Veterinary Medicine
Campus Santo Amaro
Campus Vergueiro
Campus Vila Mariana
Campus Vila Mariana II
Campus Brigadeiro/Liberdade – Technology courses.

Graduate Academic Offerings

Master's degree in Architecture 
Master's degree in Law 
Master's degree in Management 
Master's degree in Administration & Gouvernance 
MBA in Auditing
MBA in Management and Business Strategy
MBA in Finances & Banking
MBA in IT Management 
MBA in Fashion Design Management 
MBA in School Management
Specialisation in higher education tutoring 
Specialisation in Biology 
Specialisation in Nursing
Specialisation in Dentistry
Specialisation in Physiotherapy 
Specialisation in Pharmacy
Specialisation in Physical Education
Specialisation in E-commerce
Specialisation in Management
Specialisation in Digital Games
Specialisation in Journalism
Specialisation in Marketing

References

External links
 Sítio oficial 
 Pós-graduação 
 Mestrado 

Universities and colleges in São Paulo
Educational institutions established in 1968
1968 establishments in Brazil
Private universities and colleges in Brazil